Nasrabad (also Romanized as Naşrābād) is a village in Jolgeh Rural District Rural District, Shahrabad District, Bardaskan County, Razavi Khorasan Province, Iran. At the 2006 census, its population was 223, in 55 families.

References 

Populated places in Bardaskan County